Utricularia sect. Avesicaria is a section in the genus Utricularia. Both species in this section are endemic to Central and South America.

See also 
 List of Utricularia species

References 

Utricularia
Plant sections